Wioletta Kryza also known as Violetta Kryza  (born 10 August 1968) is a Polish long-distance runner who is a national champion in the marathon.

Biography
Between 20 September 1992 and 2 December 2007, Kryza won 26. Kryza's first marathon victory was at the 1992 Montreal International Marathon where she is a three-time champion of the event. Her last victory was at the 2007 California International Marathon. Kryza also won the Zwei Länder Marathon five consecutive times between 1996 and 2000.

She won the 2002 Pittsburgh Marathon, but was disqualified and suspended for two-years for failing a drug test. In 2012, she failed another test and was suspended for 8 years.

Kryza holds Poland's all-comers record in the women's marathon.

Achievements

References

External links
IAAF profile

1968 births
Living people
Polish female long-distance runners
Polish female marathon runners
Polish sportspeople in doping cases
Doping cases in athletics
People from Bełchatów County
Sportspeople from Łódź Voivodeship
20th-century Polish women
21st-century Polish women